The 8×52mmR Mannlicher cartridge was first introduced in 1888 for the Mannlicher M1888 rifle, an updated version of the Mannlicher M1886.

Description
The round was given the designation 8mm M.88 scharfe Patrone (8mm M88 Sharp Cartridge). It was loaded with a 244gr round nosed bullet and a 62gr charge of compressed black powder. This gave the bullet an approximate velocity of  out of the M.88's 30" barrel. Many M.86 rifles were converted to accommodate this new cartridge, creating the M.86/88 and M.86/90.

It was succeeded by the semi-smokeless and later (fully) smokeless powder 8×50mmR Mannlicher cartridge.

References

Military cartridges
Rimmed cartridges